Yuxi Town is a town and the county seat in the central south of Yizhang County, Hunan, China. Yuxi Town is located under the Qitian Mountains, it is bordered by Pingshi Town of Lechang City to the south, Wuling Town to the east, Liangtian Town of Suxian District to the north, Meitian Town to the west. Its seat is at Luojiashan Village.

References

Yizhang County
County seats in Hunan
Towns of Chenzhou